Christian Jean-Marie Clavier (born 6 May 1952) is a French actor, screenwriter, film producer and director. He became widely popular after starring in two hit comedy series: Patrice Leconte's Les Bronzés and Les Visiteurs directed by Jean-Marie Poiré. He furthered his popularity by taking a role of Asterix in the screen adaptations of the comic books by Albert Uderzo and René Goscinny.

He is the brother of French film director Stéphane Clavier.

Life and career 
After his high class studies at the Neuilly Lycée Pasteur—though asserted here and there, he never studied at Institut d'Études Politiques de Paris (Sciences Po) —he started his actor career with the comedic theater troupe Splendid, which had hits with films like Les Bronzés font du ski and Le Père Noël est une ordure.

His most notable success without the Splendid group, and by far his biggest hit to date, was in the 1993 film les Visiteurs, where he played a character known as Jacquouille la Fripouille; the character's cry of "Okkkayyy!!" became a popular exclamation after the movie's success.

After les Visiteurs he was a star, participating in big-budget films like Astérix et Obélix contre César, Astérix & Obélix: Mission Cléopâtre, and the sequel and remake of Visiteurs. He also played several dramatic roles on television, including M. Thénardier in Les Misérables (2000 television version) and Napoléon in a biographical television film. In 2018, he returned to the character of Asterix, this time by providing the character's voice in the animated film Asterix: The Secret of the Magic Potion. Succeeding the character's original voice actor, Roger Carel, it was his first role in an animated movie.

Clavier has played in notable duos with:
 Jean Reno in les Visiteurs (the Visitors) and the US remake, Just Visiting, L'Opération Corned-Beef and L'Enquête Corse (The Corsican investigation).
 Gérard Depardieu in Astérix et Obélix (Asterix and Obelix) and Les anges gardiens.

He also runs a production company, Ouille Production.

He was made Chevalier (Knight) of the Ordre national du Mérite on 13 June 1998, and promoted Officier (Officer) in 2005. He was made Chevalier (Knight) of the Légion d'honneur in 2008.

He is a friend of former French président Nicolas Sarkozy, and in 2012 emigrated to The United Kingdom. He denies this was as a result of Francois Hollande's punitive tax policy.

Filmography

Actor

Producer 
 Les Visiteurs 2 : Les Couloirs du temps (1998)
 Les Visiteurs en Amérique (2001)
 Le Cœur sur la main (2001)
 Lovely Rita, sainte patronne des cas désespérés (2003)

Box-office 
Movies starring Christian Clavier with more than a million of admissions in France.

References

External links 

 

1952 births
20th-century French male actors
21st-century French male actors
Chevaliers of the Légion d'honneur
French film directors
French film producers
French male stage actors
French male film actors
French male television actors
French male screenwriters
French screenwriters
Living people
Lycée Pasteur (Neuilly-sur-Seine) alumni
Male actors from Paris
Officers of the Ordre national du Mérite